The Windsor Park neighborhood is located in Austin, Texas, and bounded on the south by 51st St. to Tilley St., southwest to Philomena St., southeast along the Central Texas Emergency Command Center and Troublemaker Studios property line to Zach Scott St., east to Manor Rd., northeast to Northeast Dr., northwest/north to US Highway 290, east to Interstate 35 in Texas|IH35], then south to E 51st St.

External links
 Windsor Park Website
 Windsor Park Listserv
 broken Statesman Article: Windsor Park Preserves Old Austin Vibe
 Map of Windsor Park
 Historic Photo of Windsor Park
 1955 Archival Video of Windsor Park

Neighborhoods in Austin, Texas